The 1st edition of Vuelta a España took place from 29 April to 15 May 1935, and consisted of 14 stages and , the winning average speed was . The Vuelta began and ended in Madrid, Spain.

The field consisted of 50 riders including 33 Spanish riders; 29 finished the race. The weather conditions (rainy and cold) were said to have been to the advantage of the Belgian riders. Belgian Gustaaf Deloor took the leader's jersey with nine minutes advantage on the third stage. Deloor was challenged by Mariano Cañardo. However, on the thirteenth stage, Canardo crashed and lost five minutes. On the final stage, Deloor displayed panache to attack and win the stage and the General classification into Madrid.

Participants

There were two teams entering the Vuelta: B.H. and Orbea. The other participants, mostly Spanish, entered individually.

Final standings

Stage results

General classification

There were 29 cyclists who had completed all fourteen stages. For these cyclists, the times they had needed in each stage was added up for the general classification. The cyclist with the least accumulated time was the winner.

Mountains classification

References

 
1935
1935 in Spanish sport
1935 in road cycling
April 1935 sports events
May 1935 sports events